Cabomba aquatica is a popular aquarium plant that belongs to the family Cabombaceae and genus Cabomba. It is a perennial aquatic plant that lives in fresh standing water or in lakes and rivers with slight currents.

Description
Cabomba aquatica mainly propagate by detachment of stem portions from the mother plant, and have adventitious roots that are produced in the nodes. Their stems consist of horizontal basal portions as well as ascendant portions that usually reach the surface during flower production. The stems may grow up to 50 centimetres.

The leaves of the Cabomba aquatica are floating and they produce exclusively at the apical parts of the stem; this usually accompanies flower production. The first floating leaf of this plant will always appear at the same node as the submerged apical leaf. The plant has orbicular leaves and the stems have fine and longitudinal striations which are red most of the time. Red striations may also occur on the petioles.

In Cabomba aquatica, one ovule is produced from each carpel and the pollen to ovule ratio is of ca. 1000:1. This plant is facultatively xenogamous; and during fruiting, it will develop one carpel in an indehiscent and follicle-like fruit. The shape of the seed is usually oval.

Distribution and habitat
Cabomba aquatica is commonly known as fanwort or giant cabomba. It originated from South America. The plant does well in an aquatic condition with fresh hard water and minimal light. The plant thrives between a pH of 6-7.5 and a temperature of 22-28 degrees Celsius.

Uses and culture
Cabomba aquatica is beneficial to lakes, dams, and even rivers because they produce oxygen and take in carbon dioxide; this helps in the overall functioning of the particular water body. The plant also provides food to some marine animals as well as other wildlife. Hence, they help maintain the aquatic ecosystem.

Cabomba aquatica is also important in the aquatic ecosystem because it acts as an efficient accumulator of heavy metals in water bodies. This plant has great potential for the phytoremediation of water with heavy metals. Other aquatic plants that may serve the same purpose include: Vallisneria spiralis and Echinodorus cordifolius. This property makes these plants perfect candidates for researching, modeling, and testing various ecological theories on plant succession and evolution, as well as on metal and nutrient cycling.

Cabomba aquatica is easy to culture in the laboratory and; hence, reliable items for ecotoxicological investigations. Grown plants are transferred into nutrient solution and further grown in aquariums whose environments are controlled. The aquariums should be equipped with fluorescent tubes to produce 14/10 h light (dark photoperiods) at a temperature of 24-28C. The plant is left for 3 days so as to acclimatize.

References

Nymphaeales
Freshwater plants